Gray Peak is an 11,573-foot-elevation (3,527 meter) mountain summit located in the Sierra Nevada mountain range, in Madera County of northern California, United States. Gray Peak is the fourth-highest peak in the Clark Range, which is a subset of the Sierra Nevada.

History
The peak was probably named by the Wheeler Survey when it explored the Yosemite region in 1878 and 1879. This geographical feature's descriptive name, due to black iron-bearing minerals, was shown on an 1893 Le Conte map as Gray Peak, and was officially adopted in 1897 by the U.S. Board on Geographic Names. In 1920, Ansel Adams left a Sierra Club cylinder-type register at the summit.

Climate
According to the Köppen climate classification system, Gray Peak is located in an alpine climate zone. Most weather fronts originate in the Pacific Ocean, and travel east toward the Sierra Nevada mountains. As fronts approach, they are forced upward by the peaks, causing them to drop their moisture in the form of rain or snowfall onto the range (orographic lift). Precipitation runoff from this mountain drains into tributaries of the Merced River.

See also
 Geology of the Yosemite area

References

External links

 Weather forecast: Gray Peak

Mountains of Madera County, California
Mountains of Yosemite National Park
North American 3000 m summits
Mountains of Northern California
Sierra Nevada (United States)
Landforms of Yosemite National Park